Sripur Chhatiwan (Nepali: श्रिपुर छतिवन ) a village development committee in Makwanpur District in the Narayani Zone of southern Nepal. At the time of the 2011 Nepal census it had a population of 21,523 holding its position to highest population rank among the list of village development committees of Nepal.

References

Populated places in Makwanpur District